Diana Nasution (5 April 1958 – 4 October 2013), was a very popular Indonesian singer and actress in the 1970s and 1980s.

References

External links
  Profil Diana Nasution Kapanlagi.com
  Bio Diana Nasution Wowkeren.com

1958 births
2013 deaths
People from Medan
People of Batak descent
Deaths from cancer in Indonesia
20th-century Indonesian women singers
Indonesian pop singers
Indonesian rock singers
Converts to Protestantism from Islam
Indonesian Protestants
Indonesian former Muslims